Piggledene is a 4.7 hectare biological and geological Site of Special Scientific Interest in Wiltshire, notified in 1965. Since 1908 it has been owned by the National Trust.

Sources
 Natural England citation sheet for the site (accessed 11 April 2022)

References

External links
 Natural England website (SSSI information)

Sites of Special Scientific Interest in Wiltshire
Sites of Special Scientific Interest notified in 1965